A black and tan is a beer cocktail made by layering a pale beer (usually pale ale) and a dark beer (usually stout). In Ireland, the drink is called a half and half because in Ireland the term "black and tan" is considered to be offensive.

History
The term likely originated in England, where consumers have blended different beers since at least the 17th century. The tradition of blending beers can be traced to London during the 1700s where beer blends or "three-threads" and "five-threads" were consumed. Each thread was a beer type that was blended into a drink. Three threads was a form of mixed beer alehouses sold to avoid paying a higher tax on beer. By taking a strong beer taxed at a higher rate and mixing it with a small beer taxed at a lower-rate afforded brewers a profit. This practice continued from the late 1690s to 1700s. The earliest recorded usage of the term black and tan in the drink context is from 1881, according to the Oxford English Dictionary, in the American magazine Puck. The first recorded British use of the term to describe a drink is from 1889.

However, the name "black and tan" is not used in Ireland as a term for a mixture of two beers. The drink is instead referred to as a half and half. In Ireland, the term "black and tan" is associated with the Royal Irish Constabulary Reserve Force, nicknamed the "Black and Tans", which was sent into Ireland in the early 1920s during the Irish War of Independence and resulted in violent outbreaks between the forces and the Irish people.

In March 2006, Ben and Jerry's released an ice cream flavor in the United States for Saint Patrick's Day inspired by the drink. The branding of the flavor offended Irish nationalists because of the paramilitary association. Ben and Jerry's apologised and a spokesman told Reuters, "Any reference on our part to the British Army unit was absolutely unintentional and no ill will was ever intended."

In March 2012, the drink's name was in the news again when Nike, as part of an Irish themed set of designs, released a pair of shoes advertised as the "Black and Tan". This line of shoes generated offense in Ireland for its naming, similar to the Ben and Jerry's ice cream.

In Australia, one can order a “Toohey’s Recent”, which uses Toohey’s Old and Toohey’s New for the dark and pale beers, respectively.

Preparation

A black and tan is prepared by filling a glass halfway with pale ale, then adding stout to fill the glass completely. An upside-down tablespoon may be placed over the glass to avoid splashing and mixing the layers. A specially designed black-and-tan spoon is bent in the middle so that it can balance on the edge of the pint-glass for easier pouring. The "layering" of Guinness on top of the pale ale or lager is possible because of the lower relative density of the Guinness. 

Several American breweries currently make premixed black and tan, for example Yuengling makes a drink called Yuengling's Original Black and Tan.

See also
 Black velvet (cocktail)
 Irish car bomb
 Queen Mary (cocktail)
 Shandy

References

Cocktails with beer
Cocktails